Solidarumas is a national trade union center in Lithuania. It has a membership of 52,000 and is affiliated with the International Trade Union Confederation and the European Trade Union Confederation.

References

External links
 Official site.

Trade unions in Lithuania
International Trade Union Confederation
European Trade Union Confederation
Organizations based in Vilnius